Chemistry and Love is a 1948 East German comedy film directed by Arthur Maria Rabenalt and starring Hans Nielsen, Tilly Lauenstein and Ralph Lothar. It is an anti-capitalist satire inspired by a stage play by the communist writer Béla Balázs. The plot is built around the discoveries of a crusading inventor.

It was made by the state-controlled DEFA and shot at the Johannisthal Studios in East Berlin. The film's sets were designed by the art director Emil Hasler.

Cast

References

Bibliography

External links

1948 comedy films
German comedy films
East German films
German black-and-white films
Films directed by Arthur Maria Rabenalt
1940s German-language films
1940s German films
Films shot at Johannisthal Studios